Alper Derinboğaz (Turkish pronunciation: [alpæɾ deɾiɲboːaz]; born in 1982) is a Turkish architect, and founder of Salon Alper Derinboğaz architecture practise that has been recognised as one of Archdaily’s Best Young Practices of 2020. Derinboğaz represented Turkey in its debut year at the Venice Architecture Biennale in 2014 with his work Modalities of the Spontaneous, an in-depth study of the urban transformation of Istanbul.

Career 
Derinboğaz graduated from Istanbul Technical University in 2005 and received the Fulbright scholarship to study at UCLA, where he won the Graduate Award for his master’s studies. While working in Los Angeles until 2011, he founded Salon as an Istanbul and Berlin based international architecture practice.

His first built works were selected for the Best Architecture Collection of the year and he received the Arkitera Young Architect Award in 2011. Derinboğaz won the Plan Award for Innovative Architecture in 2015. His project Antalya Green Hub was awarded the Green Good Design Award by the Chicago Athenaeum in 2018. His work has also won the German Design Award by the German Design Council.

In 2019, he was selected as one of the 40 Under 40 architects of Europe by The European Center. He was awarded as "Best Young Practices" in 2020 by Archdaily. He is frequently invited to events as a speaker and his works are widely published and exhibited in global art and architectural publications. He also teaches architectural and urban design studios in several universities as an adjunct professor.

Work 

Derinboğaz’s projects vary from large scale cultural institutions to art installations and masterplans. His work investigates the possibilities of the physical environment through the relationship between space and time. According to Chris Van Uffelen, his work breaks up conventional thinking to create innovative and flexible design solutions. Derinboğaz defines his practise as an intent to create continuities between human, space and the earth in his book project where he gathers his research since 2011.

In 2014, his work “Modalities of the Spontaneous” was exhibited in the 14th Venice Architecture Biennale as part of the Turkish Pavilion, Places of Memory. This work was a series of reliefs generated through an investigation into the transformation of urban texture in the Levent district in Istanbul. Starting from the idea that the Turkish largest city has grown “spontaneously” over time, Derinboğaz questioned how the underlying geographic and socio-economic background shaped the evolution of the city in the last 100 years and possibly will go on to do so in the future.
Derinboğaz’s museum works are mostly characterised by social dialogue and contextual understanding. The most significant of these is the Museum of Istanbul project that is located next to the UNESCO listed Theodosian Land Walls in İstanbul. This building aims to link land walls to the modern transportation hub in the Topkapi area, seeking to activate a public space that connects the history of the city with contemporary society.

His adaptive re-use project Fitaş Passage is completed in 2019, located in İstiklal Avenue which is a vibrant pedestrian axis in Istanbul. This project reclaims an historic arcade space while seeking a new relationship with the avenue. The facade of the building is designed with angled vertical panels by considering the perceived view while walking on the street. These vertical facade elements, reminiscent of the historic vertical signboards, aim to create a spatial interactivity between building and street.

Notable Projects 

 Modalities of the Spontaneous, Pavilion of Turkey at la Biennale di Venezia, Venice 2014
 Museum of Istanbul, Istanbul
 Fitaş Passage, Istanbul, 2019
 Augmented Structures v1.1, Yapı Kredi Culture and Arts Centre, Istanbul 2011
 Villa Topos, Çeşme, İzmir, (completed 2021)
 Learning Sky Library, Songdo, South Korea 2021
 Green HUB Masterplan, Antalya
 Stoa House, Istanbul, (completed 2017)
 Science Island, Kaunas, Lithuania, 2016

Books 
 2021, Geoscapes (ed. Emmy Bacharach), (asst. ed. Emre Taş)
 2018, Upwind (ed. Turkay, B.), (designer; Gürevin, A.)
 2014, Places of Memory (ed. Derviş, P.), Conversation (Luca Molinari in conversation with A.Altay, A.Derinboğaz, P.Derviş, M.Özcan, C.Şişman, M.Tabanlıoğlu, A.Taptık, S.Taycan), pp. 6–80, Istanbul Foundation for Culture and Arts, Istanbul
 2011, My City (eds. Açıkkol, Ö. & Yersel, S.), Alper Derinboğaz, Panorama için Mimari Tasarım (interview) pp. 124–131, British Council, Istanbul
 2010, City Index Elefsina (ed. Antonopoulou, E.), Float’d Project, pp. 116–121, School of Architecture Technical University of Athens, Athens

Recognitions 

 2020 Archdaily Best Young Practices Award
 2019 Europe 40 Under 40 Selection, Architecture, The European Center
 2011 Young Architect of the Year Award by Arkitera
 2008 UCLA School of Architecture Graduate Award
 2008 Fulbright Award

Awards 

 2021 Memorial Design for Pandemics and Health Labourers Competition, Second Prize
 2021 Songdo Library International Design Competition, Honorable Mention
 2020 Istanbul's Cemetery Design Competition (Cihat Burak) 1st Prize
 2020 Meles Stream as Ecological Corridor Urban Design Competition, Winner of 1st Prize
 2020 Golden Horn Waterfront Design Competition, 1st Mention
 2020 Velux Bringing Light to Life Award, Chinimachin Museum
 2019 Young Architects Selection & Exhibition, The Circle
 2018 Green Good Design Awards, Winner, Chicago Athenaeum (Antalya GreenHUB Masterplan)
 2017 German Design Awards, Winner, German Design Council (Parkopera)
 2017 World Architecture Awards, Winner (Parkopera)
 2016 International Contest for the New National Science and Innovation Center Honorable Mention
 2016 World Architecture Awards Winner (Office Central)
 2016 WAF Finalist (Parkopera)
 2016 Valley of Life International Competition, 3th Prize
 2015 International Architizer A+ Award Special Mention
 2015 Parkopera, National Competition Winner of 1st Mention
 2015 Beylikduzu Valley and Bridge National Competition Winner of Mention
 2011 Best Buildings of 2011 by Arkiv (Augmented Structures, Gate, Panaroma)
 2006 SMD “S.O.S. Istanbul Seashores Renewal Competition”, 1st Prize
 2005 International Europan8 “Renewal For Which Inhabitants?”, Antalya Kepez (TU), National Chapter
 2005 Turkey Architecture Association Success Award
 2004 UIA “Celebrating Cities International Competition”, Jury Great Prize

References 

Turkish architects
1982 births
Living people